Wings 1971–73 is a box set released by Paul McCartney as part of Paul McCartney Archive Collection on 7 December 2018. The box set contains deluxe versions of the archive collection reissues of the Wings albums Wild Life and Red Rose Speedway and the new live album Wings Over Europe, covering the Wings Over Europe Tour, the latter is exclusive to the box set. Additional exclusive content to the box set are a Wings Over Europe 96-page photo book and facsimile 1972 tour programme. Wings 1971–73 was released in limited quantities simultaneously with reissues of Wild Life and Red Rose Speedway.

Contents

Wings Over Europe

References

Paul McCartney compilation albums
2018 compilation albums